Keith Kloor is an American freelance writer and journalism professor. He teaches magazine article writing as an adjunct lecturer for the Arthur L. Carter journalism institute at New York University, as well as Urban Environmental Reporting at the CUNY Graduate School of Journalism and is a former fellow of the Center for Environmental Journalism. He lives in Brooklyn, New York.

Career
Kloor is an adjunct professor of journalism at the CUNY Graduate School of Journalism, Stevens Institute of Technology, and the New York University Arthur L. Carter Journalism Institute.

From 2000 to 2008, he was an editor at Audubon Magazine. From 2008 to 2009 he was a Fellow at the University of Colorado's Center for Environmental Journalism. From 2013 to 2014 Kloor served as a Senior Editor for Cosmos Magazine.

From early 2009 until April 15, 2015, Kloor wrote a blog entitled Collide-a-Scape for Discover magazine.

Kloor has written for Nature, Science and for the Archaeological Institute of America.  Other major publication credits include: Smithsonian Magazine, Science, The Washington Post Magazine, Archaeology, Backpacker, Issues in Science and Technology, High Country News, Mother Jones, Cosmos, Slate, Yale Environment 360, Yale Forum on Climate Change & the Media, Climate Central, and Bloomberg Business.

Controversy 
In 2015, US Right to Know claimed that a number of Journalists have been writing columns in different mainstream media after allegedly receiving financial benefit from agrochemical company Monsanto for covertly promoting GMO and its usage without disclosing their such financial relationship. Kloor was mentioned as one of the alleged professional. In 2018, US Right to know made a number of e-mail communications public claiming the same as the evidence of Kloor's having financial relationship with GMO conglomerates. in February 2015, Kloor had written a column in Science Magazine, criticizing US Right to Know for using Freedom of Information Act (FOIA) to allege 14 'pro-GMO' scientists to have undisclosed commercial relationship.

Bibliography

References

External links

American male journalists
Living people
Science bloggers
Environmental bloggers
American bloggers
Writers from Brooklyn
Journalists from New York City
Cosmos (Australian magazine) people
Year of birth missing (living people)
21st-century American non-fiction writers
American male bloggers